Anasedulia   is a monotypic genus of grasshoppers in the subfamily Catantopinae and tribe Gereniini.  The single species to date, Anasedulia maejophrae, has been found in Indo-China (Thailand).

References

External links 
 Photo at iNaturalist
 

Acrididae genera
Catantopinae 
Orthoptera of Indo-China
Monotypic Orthoptera genera